Sturgeon Creek is a former provincial electoral division in the Canadian province of Manitoba.  It was created by redistribution in 1969, and was abolished in 1999.

Sturgeon Creek was located in the northwestern area section of Winnipeg.  It was bordered to the west by Kirkfield Park and Assiniboia, to the south by Tuxedo, to the east by Wellington and St. James, and to the north by the rural riding of Lakeside.  When the riding was abolished, its territory was incorporated into the new St. James riding.

List of provincial representatives

Election results

Former provincial electoral districts of Manitoba

References